Yadaram is a village and panchayat in Rangareddy district, Telangana, India. It comes under Medchal mandal.  It is situated 14 km away from sub-district headquarter Domakonda and 84 km away from district headquarter Nizamabad. The total geographical area of village is 931 hectares. Yadaram has a total population of 2,230 people. There are about 571 houses in Yadaram village. Kamareddy is nearest town to Yadaram which is approximately 34 km away.

References

Villages in Ranga Reddy district